Christine Stanley is a Taiwanese American mixed martial artist who competes in the Flyweight division in Invicta.

Mixed martial arts career
Stanley made her professional debut against Leah Barfield at NFC 12 on April 13, 2012. She won the fight by a first-round knockout. Stanley amassed a 3–1 record before signing with Invicta FC, with all fights ending in a stoppage.

Stanley made her Invicta debut against Laura Salazar at Invicta FC 11: Cyborg vs. Tweet on February 27, 2015. She won the fight by a first-round technical knockout.

Stanley faced Shannon Sinn at Invicta FC 17: Evinger vs. Schneider on May 7, 2016. She won the fight by unanimous decision.

Stanley faced Agnieszka Niedźwiedź at Invicta FC 18: Grasso vs. Esquibel on July 29, 2016. She lost the fight by unanimous decision.

Stanley faced Kelly Kobold-Schmitz at LFA 20 on August 25, 2017. The fight was ruled a split decision draw.

Mixed martial arts record

|-
| Draw
| align=center| 5–3–1
| Kelly Kobold-Schmitz 
| Draw (split)
| LFA 20
| 
| align=center| 3
| align=center| 5:00
| Prior Lake, Minnesota
| 
|-
| Loss
| align=center| 5–3
| Liz Tracy
| Decision (split)
| SFL 51: America
| 
| align=center| 3
| align=center| 5:00
| Tacoma, Washington
| 
|-
| Loss
| align=center| 5–2
| Agnieszka Niedźwiedź
| Decision (unanimous)
| Invicta FC 18: Grasso vs. Esquibel
| 
| align=center| 3
| align=center| 5:00
| Kansas City, Missouri
| 
|-
| Win
| align=center| 5–1
| Shannon Sinn
| Decision (unanimous)
| Invicta FC 17: Evinger vs. Schneider
| 
| align=center| 3
| align=center| 5:00
| Costa Mesa, California
| 
|-
| Win
| align=center| 4–1
| Laura Salazar
| TKO (punches)
| Invicta FC 11: Cyborg vs. Tweet
| 
| align=center| 1
| align=center| 2:59
| Los Angeles, California
| 
|-
| Win
| align=center| 3–1
| Katie Anita Runyan
| KO (flying spinning hook kick)
| XFS Tidal Wave
| 
| align=center| 1
| align=center| 0:05
| Valley Center, California
| 
|-
| Win
| align=center| 2–1
| Jackie Bollinger
| TKO (punches)
| XFS Feast or Famine
| 
| align=center| 1
| align=center| 0:58
| Valley Center, California
| 
|-
| Loss
| align=center| 1–1
| Justine Kish
| Submission (armbar)
| RFA 9: Munhoz vs. Curran
| 
| align=center| 2
| align=center| 4:29
| Los Angeles, California
| 
|-
| Win
| align=center| 1–0
| Leah Barfield
| TKO (punches)
| Native Fighting Championships 12
| 
| align=center| 1
| align=center| 0:29
| Campo, California
| 
|-

References

External links
Christine Stanley Twitter
 

1980 births
Taiwanese female taekwondo practitioners
Sportspeople from Taipei
Living people
American female mixed martial artists
Flyweight mixed martial artists
Mixed martial artists utilizing taekwondo
Mixed martial artists utilizing Brazilian jiu-jitsu
American female taekwondo practitioners
American sportspeople of Taiwanese descent
LGBT mixed martial artists
American practitioners of Brazilian jiu-jitsu
Female Brazilian jiu-jitsu practitioners
American sportspeople of Chinese descent
LGBT Brazilian jiu-jitsu practitioners
LGBT taekwondo practitioners
21st-century LGBT people
21st-century American women